Aughnacliffe, officially Aghnacliff , is a village in County Longford, Ireland. It is located close to Lough Gowna and the border with County Cavan.

The village, and the townland in which it is located, take their name from the Aughnacliffe Dolmen, a portal tomb which is located nearby. The local Roman Catholic Church is dedicated to St. Columcille and was built in 1834. St. Thomas's Church Of Ireland church, in the neighbouring townland of Rathmore, was built in 1829. The local GAA club is Colmcille GFC.

References

Towns and villages in County Longford